George Augustus Morris, Jr. (March 19, 1931 – December 10, 2007) was an American football player. Born in Vicksburg, Mississippi, he played college football for the Georgia Tech Yellow Jackets and professionally for the San Francisco 49ers for one season in 1956. He was elected to the College Football Hall of Fame in 1981. He died of an apparent heart attack at age 76 in Highlands, North Carolina.

References

1931 births
2007 deaths
San Francisco 49ers players
Georgia Tech Yellow Jackets football players
College Football Hall of Fame inductees
Sportspeople from Vicksburg, Mississippi